Forest Green may refer to:

Music
A hymn tune arranged by Ralph Vaughan Williams for singing "O Little Town of Bethlehem"
"Forest Green, Oh Forest Green", a single by Holly Miranda
"Forest Green", a song by Odd Future from The OF Tape Vol. 2
"Forest Green", a song by Big Red Machine from their self-titled album

Places
Forest Green, Surrey, England
Forest Green, Gloucestershire, England
Forest Green, Missouri, United States
A community in Perry Township, Michigan, United States
An area of Upton, Massachusetts, United States

Other
Forest green, a shade of green
Forest Green Rovers F.C., a football club in Gloucestershire, England
Forest green butterfly (Euryphura achlys), a butterfly of Africa
'Forest Green', an episode of The Mentalist (season 6)
Forest Green (novel), a novel from Canadian novelist Kate Pullinger